Steffen Lie Skålevik (born 31 January 1993) is a Norwegian football player who currently plays for Sogndal, on loan from Sarpsborg 08.

Career

Early years
Lie Skålevik grew up in Sotra outside of Bergen and climbed up the ranks of his local club, Sotra SK, before he was picked up by SK Brann's youth academy in 2012, 19 years old. He played 36 games and scored 13 goals for SK Brann 2 in the Norwegian 2. divisjon (third tier) before leaving to Nest-Sotra in the same division.

Nest-Sotra
Lie Skålevik became an important player for the Nest-Sotra side who went on to win their division and a promotion to the Norwegian First Division. The following season in 2014 he kept impressing and played an important role in avoiding relegation, scoring 12 goals in 29 games. In 2015, he really started showing his eye for goal, scoring 10 goals in 18 matches, before he was sold to SK Brann halfways into the season.

SK Brann
On 15 August 2015 he rejoined SK Brann, replacing Marcus Pedersen who was sold to Strømsgodset two days prior.

Career statistics

Club

References

1993 births
Living people
People from Hordaland
Norwegian footballers
Nest-Sotra Fotball players
SK Brann players
IK Start players
Sarpsborg 08 FF players
Norwegian First Division players
Eliteserien players
Association football defenders
Sportspeople from Vestland